Cat Rock Sluice of the Roanoke Navigation is a historic sluice located near Brookneal, Campbell County, Virginia. Cat Rock Sluice is at Staunton Scenic River Mile 9.85.  It consists of a deep cut about 10 feet wide, blasted through the south end of a wide rock ledge and extending across the main river channel.   Associated with it is a "towing wall" measuring about 6 feet thick and at least 5 feet high.  The wall was probably originally continuous, from about 50 feet above the cut to 300 feet below it.  The 11-mile network of sluices and associated wing dams and towing walls was constructed by Samuel Pannill of Green Hill in 1827.  It was built for the Roanoke Navigation Company to permit the passage of poled river boats, called batteaux, through the falls of the Staunton River.

It was listed on the National Register of Historic Places in 1980.

References

Transportation buildings and structures on the National Register of Historic Places in Virginia
Buildings and structures completed in 1827
Buildings and structures in Campbell County, Virginia
National Register of Historic Places in Campbell County, Virginia
Water transportation buildings and structures on the National Register of Historic Places
1827 establishments in Virginia